Chinna Karayambuthur  is a village in Bahour Commune of Bahour taluk  in the Union Territory of Puducherry, India. It lies on the eastern part of Karaiyamputhur Enclave of Puducherry. Chinna Karaiyamputhur serves as a link between Karaiyamputhur and Manamedu Enclave. Chinna Karaiyamputhur is a part of Karaiyamputhur Village Panchayat.

Gallery

References

External links
Official website of the Government of the Union Territory of Puducherry

Villages in Puducherry district